Neomelicharia is a genus of planthoppers belonging to the family Flatidae.

The species of this genus are found in Indonesia.

Species
Neomelicharia centralis 
Neomelicharia consociata 
Neomelicharia cruentata 
Neomelicharia diversa 
Neomelicharia guttulata 
Neomelicharia handschini 
Neomelicharia indicata 
Neomelicharia lucentis 
Neomelicharia punctulata 
Neomelicharia roseola 
Neomelicharia sparsa 
Neomelicharia tripunctata 
Neomelicharia variegata

References

Flatidae